Polystira oxytropis is a species of sea snail, a marine gastropod mollusk in the family Turridae, the turrids.

Description
The horn-colored shell contains several sharp keels and numerous spiral raised lines. The upper keel is the strongest, angulating the whorls, the surface concave above it. 

P. oxytropis is considered an "umbrella species" with considerable diversity as shown by DNA sequence data coupled with conchological studies.

Distribution
This is an Eastern Pacific species, occurring off Western Mexico, in the Gulf of Panama and the Pacific coast of Colombia.

References

 Berry S.S. (1957). Notices of new eastern Pacific Mollusca.- I. Leaflets in Malacology. 1(14): 75-82.

External links
 Sowerby, G. B. I. (1833-1834). [Characters of new species of shells from the collection formed by Mr. Cuming on the western coast of South America and among the islands of the South Pacific Ocean. Proceedings of the Zoological Society of London. 1833: 16-22, 34-38]

oxytropis
Gastropods described in 1834